Hanousek (feminine Hanousková) is a Czech surname. Notable people with the surname include:

 Marek Hanousek (born 1991), Czech footballer
 Matěj Hanousek (born 1993), Czech footballer
 Matt Hanousek (born 1963), American football player

Czech-language surnames